A. Nand Kishore (born 10 July 1970) is an Indian former first-class cricketer. He is now an umpire and stood in matches in the 2015–16 Ranji Trophy.

References

External links
 

1970 births
Living people
Indian cricketers
Indian cricket umpires
Hyderabad cricketers
People from Warangal